Superband was a mandopop supergroup formed by four veteran singers Lo Ta-yu, Jonathan Lee, Wakin Chau and Chang Chen-yue.

The group was formed in 2008. In total they have released over 70 albums in their individual careers, 600 main compositions and more than 350 individual concerts.

After giving twenty performances around the world, the band held their final concert in the Mohegan Sun Arena in Connecticut, USA on 22 February 2010. Afterwards they resumed their individual careers.

Discography

 2009 – North Bound (北上列車) (EP)
 2010 – Go South (南下專線) (EP)
 2010 - Live in Taipei/出发

World Tour Concert

References

Mandopop musical groups
Taiwanese boy bands